In mathematics, a bisymmetric matrix is a square matrix that is symmetric about both of its main diagonals.  More precisely, an n × n matrix A is bisymmetric if it satisfies both A = AT and AJ = JA where J is the n × n exchange matrix.

For example, any matrix of the form

is bisymmetric.

Properties
Bisymmetric matrices are both symmetric centrosymmetric and symmetric persymmetric.
The product of two bisymmetric matrices is a centrosymmetric matrix.
Real-valued bisymmetric matrices are precisely those symmetric matrices whose eigenvalues remain the same aside from possible sign changes following pre- or post-multiplication by the exchange matrix.
If A is a real bisymmetric matrix with distinct eigenvalues, then the matrices that commute with A must be bisymmetric.
The inverse of bisymmetric matrices can be represented by recurrence formulas.

References

Matrices